The 1994 IIHF Women's World Championships was held April 11–17, 1994, at the Herb Brooks Arena in Lake Placid, New York, in the United States. The Team Canada won their third consecutive gold medal at the World Championships defeating the United States. Finland picked up their third consecutive bronze medal, with a win over semifinal debutants, China.

Qualification

The tournament was held between eight teams. Canada and the United States received automatic qualification for the tournament. In addition, the top five teams from the 1993 European Championship would be joined by the winner of the 1994 Asian Qualification Tournament.

 - Automatically Qualified
 - Winner - 1994 Asian Qualification Tournament
 - Winner - 1993 European Championship
 - 4th place - 1993 European Championship
 - 3rd Place - 1993 European Championship
 - 5th place - 1993 European Championship
 - 2nd Place - - 1993 European Championship
 - Automatically Qualified

Asian Qualification Tournament (Japan)

Venue
The tournament took place at the Herb Brooks Arena in Lake Placid, New York, in the United States.

Final tournament

The eight participating teams were divided up into two seeded groups as below. The teams played each other once in a single round robin format. The top two teams from the group proceeded to the Final Round, while the remaining teams played in the consolation round.

First round

Group A

Standings

Results
All times local

Group B

Standings

Results
All times local

Playoff round

Consolation round 5–8 place

Consolation round 7–8 place

Consolation round 5–6 place

Final round

Semifinals

Match for third place

Final

Champions

Scoring leaders

Goaltending leaders
(minimum 40% team's total ice time)

Final standings

Directorate Awards
Goalie: Erin Whitten (United States)
Defender: Geraldine Heaney (Canada)
Forward: Riikka Nieminen, (Finland)

References

External links
 Summary from the Women's Hockey Net
 Detailed summary from passionhockey.com

IIHF Women's World Ice Hockey Championships
IIHF Women's Worlds
World
World
1994
IIHF Women's World Championship
Women's ice hockey competitions in the United States
Sports in Lake Placid, New York
Ice hockey in New York (state)
International sports competitions in New York (state)
Women's sports in New York (state)